Kedric Golston (born May 30, 1983) is a former American football defensive tackle. He was drafted by the Washington Redskins in the sixth round of the 2006 NFL Draft. He played college football at the University of Georgia.

Early life
Golston attended and played high school football at Sandy Creek High School.  While there, he was honored as a Parade Magazine All-American and Georgia Sports Writers Association All-State.  He was the Fayette County Player of the Year as a junior and senior, and was a three-time All-County pick.  As a junior, Golston registered 88 tackles and 13 sacks.  He recorded 55 tackles and 11 sacks in six games as a senior.  He is the all-time sack leader (45) at Sandy Creek.  Golston lettered twice in basketball and finished second in the state in wrestling his junior year.

In September 2001, Golston was in an automobile accident and was thrown from his car.  He sustained a broken right femur, had his lungs fill with fluid, spent two weeks in intensive care, and had to go through lengthy rehabilitation.

In 2001, Golston was inducted into the Sandy Creek High School Hall of Fame.

College career
Golston played college football for the University of Georgia.  In 2002, he was the first true freshman to start the season opener on Georgia's defensive line since Travis Stroud in 1994.  He was named Freshman All-America third-team and Freshman All-SEC first-team by The Sporting News.  Golston played in all 14 games, starting three, and recorded 34 tackles (ten individual) with 2.5 stops for losses and a forced fumble.  During that season, the team won Georgia's first SEC Championship in 20 years, defeated Florida State University to win the 2003 Sugar Bowl and set a school record for most victories in a season (13).  After the season ended he had a steel rod removed from his leg, which had been inserted after the car accident in 2001.  During the surgery, the doctors also found a calcium deposit nearly four inches long in his hip and removed it.  During his sophomore season, Golston suffered a broken shoulder blade during practice and was limited to eight games.  As a junior, he was the recipient of the Coaches Leadership Award for defense, and earned All-SEC honorable mention. He posted 23 tackles (12 individual) with 2.5 stops for losses while starting every game.   Golston played in ten games as a senior, with nine starts after being hindered by an elbow injury.  He recorded 21 tackles (13 individual), 1.5 sacks, and 28 quarterback pressures, which ranked second on the team.

In 44 games with the Bulldogs, Golston started 30 times. He collected 95 tackles (43 individual) with 3.5 sacks for minus-20 yards and 8.5 stops for losses of 36 yards.  He recovered three fumbles and deflected a pass.  Golston graduated with a degree in child and family development.

Off-the-field Issues
In April 2003, Golston was one of nine Georgia football players declared ineligible by the National Collegiate Athletic Association (NCAA) for selling their 2002 SEC Championship Game rings. The school appealed the NCAA's ruling. The university, which worked to recover the rings, did not say how much money the players received for the rings. The players were required to make restitution for the money they received from the sale of their rings.

On April 10, 2005, Golston and Georgia linebacker Derrick White were arrested for disorderly conduct for their roles in a bar fight at the Classic City Saloon around 2 a.m.  Golston also was charged with simple battery of a police officer and obstruction of a law enforcement officer.  According to an incident report, officers tried to contain White when Golston approached them and insisted they let him go.   Golston was released on $9,000 bond and all the charges involved were misdemeanors.  Golston received a one-game suspension and White received a two-game suspension.

Professional career

Washington Redskins

Golston was drafted by the Washington Redskins in the sixth round (196th overall pick) of the 2006 NFL Draft.  As a rookie, he played in all 16 regular season games with 13 starts.  On September 24, 2006, he made his first professional start against the Houston Texans and recorded three tackles (one individual) and his first career fumble recovery.

In the 2007 season, Golston played in 15 regular season games and one postseason game. He finished with 18 tackles (13 individual) and one sack. He recorded his first career sack against the New York Giants on September 23, 2007.  On October 21, 2007, Golston blocked an extra point against the Arizona Cardinals, the first extra point blocked by the Redskins since Wilber Marshall against the San Francisco 49ers on November 20, 1988.  He blocked a field goal against the Chicago Bears on December 6, 2007, which was the first field goal blocked by the Redskins since Troy Vincent did it against the Dallas Cowboys on November 5, 2006.

The following year, Golston played in 13 regular season games and started 12 games.  He was inactive for three games with an injured ankle.  He ended the season with 37 tackles (22 individual) and two sacks. He returned healthy in 2009 after signing a one-year tender worth $1.54 million and played in all 16 regular season games, starting six games.  Golston recorded 50 tackles (25 individual), six tackles for loss, two sacks, and recorded his first career forced fumble.

After the Redskins switched to a 3-4 defense in the 2010 season, Golston converted from a defensive tackle to a defensive end. By the end of the season, he started 13 games and recorded 35 tackles and one pass deflection. On December 26, 2010, he was put on injured reserve.

On August 3, 2011, Golston re-signed with the Redskins.
Golston was made the backup defensive end behind Adam Carriker for the season. In Week 10 against the Miami Dolphins, Golston was injured and was taken out of the game. On November 15, 2011, Golston was officially placed on injured reserve suffering a third-degree MCL tear and a partially torn ACL.

On April 9, 2012, Golston again re-signed with the Redskins. During the preseason, Golston claimed he was fully healed from his injuries from the previous season. Golston re-signed with the Redskins on a three-year deal on March 12, 2013.

The Redskins re-signed Golston to a one-year contract on March 9, 2016. With the prior season's starting nose tackle, Terrance Knighton, leaving the team via free agency, Golston became the Redskins' starting nose tackle. On September 19, 2016, Golston was placed on injured reserve with a hamstring injury.

Personal life
When he was in first grade, Golston's mother was murdered in a robbery.  He moved from his home in South Carolina to live with his father and stepmother outside Atlanta, Georgia after his maternal grandparents declined to take him in.  Golston and his wife, Christal, have two children, Tori and Kedric II.  Tori has become successful child model who has appeared in Macy's billboards in Times Square and in advertisements for Target, Toys "R" Us, and Linens 'n Things. Golston is a Christian.

Golston participated in the NFL's business management and entrepreneurial programs at the Harvard Business School and Wharton School of the University of Pennsylvania, which prepared players for their post-season playing careers.  He and his wife now own and run their own real estate company based out of Ashburn, Virginia. Golston also co-owns and runs a Pilates studio in Ashburn, along with former Redskins teammate, Lorenzo Alexander.

References

External links
Washington Redskins bio

1983 births
Living people
People from Tyrone, Georgia
People from Ashburn, Virginia
Sportspeople from the Atlanta metropolitan area
Sportspeople from the Washington metropolitan area
Players of American football from Georgia (U.S. state)
American football defensive ends
American football defensive tackles
Georgia Bulldogs football players
Washington Redskins players